The 1953 Colorado Buffaloes football team was an American football team that represented the University of Colorado as a member of the Big Seven Conference during the 1953 college football season. Led by sixth-year head coach Dallas Ward, the Buffaloes compiled an overall record of 6–4 with a mark of 2–4 in conference play, tying for fourth place in the Big 7. The team played its home games on campus at Folsom Field in Boulder, Colorado.

Colorado responded from four straight losses in the middle of season to finish with four straight victories, including wins over rivals Utah and Colorado A&M.

Schedule

Awards
 All-Big Seven (AP, UPI, Coaches): E Gary Knafelc

NFL Draft
Senior end Gary Knafelc was taken in the second round of the 1954 NFL Draft with 14th overall pick by the Chicago Cardinals. He played ten seasons in the NFL, mostly with the Green Bay Packers.

References

External links
 University of Colorado Athletics – 1953 football roster
 Sports-Reference – 1953 Colorado Buffaloes

Colorado
Colorado Buffaloes football seasons
Colorado Buffaloes football